is a rail shooter arcade video game developed and released by Sega in 1987. The player controls an American F-14 Tomcat fighter jet and must clear each of the game's eighteen unique stages by destroying incoming enemies. The plane is equipped with a machine gun and a limited supply of heat-seeking missiles. The game uses a third-person perspective, as in Sega's earlier Space Harrier (1985) and Out Run (1986). It runs on the Sega X Board arcade system which is capable of surface and sprite rotation. It is the fourth Sega game to use a hydraulic "taikan" motion simulator arcade cabinet, one that is more elaborate than their earlier "taikan" simulator games. The cabinet simulates an aircraft cockpit, with flight stick controls, a chair with seatbelt, and hydraulic motion technology that moves, tilts, rolls and rotates the cockpit in sync with the on-screen action.

Designed by Sega veteran Yu Suzuki and the Sega AM2 division, After Burner was intended as being Sega's first "true blockbuster" video game. Development began in December 1986, shortly after the completion of Out Run, and was kept as a closely guarded secret within the company. Suzuki was inspired by the 1986 films Top Gun and Laputa: Castle in the Sky; he originally planned for the game to have a steampunk aesthetic similar to Laputa, but instead went with a Top Gun look to make the game approachable for worldwide audiences. It was designed outside the company in a building named "Studio 128", due to Sega adopting a flextime schedule to allow for games to be worked outside company headquarters. An updated version with the addition of throttle controls, After Burner II, was released later the same year.

After Burner was a worldwide commercial success, becoming Japan's second highest-grossing large arcade game of 1987 and overall arcade game of 1988 as well as among America's top five highest-grossing dedicated arcade games of 1988. It was acclaimed by critics for its impressive visuals, gameplay and overall presentation, and is seen as being important and influential. It was followed by a series of sequels and ports for many platforms, including the Master System, ZX Spectrum and Nintendo Entertainment System. Sega also produced several successors to the game to capitalize on its success, such as G-LOC: Air Battle. After Burner has also been referenced in many other Sega video games, such as Fighters Megamix, Shenmue and Bayonetta.

Gameplay

The game allows the player to control an F-14 Tomcat jet airplane. At the start of the game, the player takes off from an aircraft carrier called the SEGA Enterprise on a mission to destroy enemy jets over 18 stages.

In the arcade version, the jet employs a machine gun and a limited number of heat-seeking missiles (in the Master System version the player has unlimited missiles). These weapons are replenished by another aircraft, after beating a few stages. The aircraft, cannon and missile buttons are all controlled from an integrated flight stick.

The game itself was released in two variations in the US: a standard upright cabinet and a closed rotating cockpit deluxe version. In the cockpit version, the seat tilted forward and backwards, and the cockpit rotated from side to side. It featured two speakers at head-level for stereo sound, and had a seatbelt to hold the player when the cockpit moved. Both cabinets contained a grey monitor frame with flashing lights at the top that indicated an enemy's "lock" on the player's craft. Japan also received a commander cabinet that moved left and right. A third variation, called commander, released elsewhere, featured an open cabinet.

Development and release
After Burner was designed by Yu Suzuki of Sega AM2, with assistance by programmer Satoshi Mifune and composer Hiroshi "Hiro" Kawaguchi. Development of the game begin in early December 1986 shortly after work on Out Run was completed, with much of the development team having worked on Out Run. After Burner was intended as Sega's first "true blockbuster" video game; as such, the project was kept as a closely guarded secret within the company during the entirety of its development cycle. When the game was in its initial concept stages, Sega had adopted a flextime work system, allowing development of games to be done outside the company; After Burner was one of the first games to be produced under this new system, with development taking place in a building named "Studio 128".

Suzuki was inspired by the film Laputa: Castle in the Sky and initially wanted to employ a similar steampunk anime aesthetic for After Burner, but this idea was scrapped early on in favor of a style akin to the movie Top Gun, as Suzuki wanted the game more approachable for a worldwide audience. The game was programmed and tested on a PC-98 system, making it the first Sega-published video game to be developed using personal computers rather than workstations.

One of the biggest challenges the team had to overcome was researching and implementing sprite and surface rotation, which for the time was considered a milestone in video games. The team also struggled with creating the smoke trails made by firing missiles, seeing several tweaks and revisions as development progressed. Unlike their earlier game Out Run, which featured real-world locations in its levels, Suzuki lacked the time to visit any specific places or landmarks, so he and his team made up their own stage settings. Suzuki toyed with the idea of having the Soviet Union as the antagonists to potentially increase sales in the west, but decided against it later on after struggling to tie it together with the game's level designs and settings. The refueling and landing sequences were created to add variety.

The After Burner arcade cabinet was significantly more expensive than most of Sega's other machines at the time. The first prototype unit constructed, which consisted of the monitor attached to a steel frame, was claimed by Mifune to have "amazing power", but was considered too dangerous to operate and had the power levels lowered. Suzuki also thought of the game using a gyroscopic arcade cabinet that spun the player around, an idea that later became the R-360. A throttle control was briefly considered, but was abandoned as it would have destroyed the game's difficulty balance. It uses the Sega X Board, which was also used for games such as Thunder Blade (1987) and Super Monaco GP (1989). After Burner was officially released in Japan in July 1987, and in October of that year in North America.

After Burner II

After Burner was followed by After Burner II, which was released in the same year (1987), also released for the Sega X Board arcade system. Some consider this game to be more of a revision of its predecessor, rather than an entirely new game, a practice later repeated by Sega for Galaxy Force and Galaxy Force II. In the game, players fly an F-14 Tomcat jet fighter, gunning down enemies while avoiding incoming fire. After Burner II came both a standard arcade cabinet and a servo actuated, sit-down motion simulator version which moved according to the motion of the plane onscreen. The cockpit would bank in the same direction the on-screen aircraft was banking. It is an updated version of After Burner, with the addition of throttle controls. It was a commercial success, becoming Japan's highest-grossing arcade game of 1988.

The game was mostly created by three men: Yu Suzuki, Satoshi Mifune, and Kawaguchi. During development, it was codenamed Studio 128 to specify the secrecy of the project.

Reception

Arcade
Game Machine listed After Burner as being the most popular arcade game of August 1987 in Japan, where it went on to be the second highest-grossing large arcade game of 1987 (just below Out Run) and the overall highest-grossing arcade game of 1988. In the United States, it was one of the top five highest-grossing dedicated arcade games of 1988, and remained a top ten earner at various arcades through 1990. In the United Kingdom, it was the top-grossing arcade game upon release in September 1987.

The arcade game received positive reviews from critics. Clare Edgeley of Computer and Video Games called it a "fabulous game" with praise for the gameplay and motion cabinet while noting it has a lock-on mechanic similar to the Data East arcade game Lock-On (1986). Top Score said it has "all the finger-numbing action of the best arcade shoot-em-ups, combined with some of the most stunning animation ever seen in a video game" and that it was "a glossy air combat game that ranks higher than similar efforts that have preceded it". The review called it "one of the most beautiful and realistic shooting games ever produced" with "somewhat shallow" gameplay that is nevertheless "definitively worth the price of admission" especially in the "cockpit simulator" cabinet.

Sinclair User reviewed the arcade game, scoring it 8 out of 10. Ciarán Brennan of Your Sinclair said that, despite the higher price point, don't "let a little thing like a pound coin stand between you and action like this". Robin Hogg of The Games Machine called it the "hottest Sega release so far" with praise for the graphics and gameplay, but with some criticism towards the £1 UK price.

At the 1987 Gamest Awards in Japan, After Burner won the Best Graphics award, while being a runner-up for Game of the Year (2nd place), Best Ending (6th place), Best VGM (4th place), Best Sound Synthesis (8th place) and Most Popular Game (3rd place). After Burner also won a Special Award at the 1988 Gamest Awards. In the United States, After Burner won the award for "Most Innovative Game" at the Amusement & Music Operators Association's 1988 AMOA Games Awards.

After Burner II

In Japan, After Burner II was tied with After Burner as the highest-grossing arcade game of 1988.

Mega placed the Mega Drive version at number 38 in their Top Mega Drive Games of All Time. MegaTech magazine praised the smooth and fast gameplay, as well as the sound.

Ports

The game was ported to the Amiga, MS-DOS, Amstrad CPC, Atari ST, X68000, FM Towns, Commodore 64, Master System, PC Engine, Sega Saturn, MS-DOS, MSX, ZX Spectrum. The C64 has two versions: a European version by U.S. Gold, and a US version by Activision and Weebee Games. A port of After Burner to the 32X was done by Rutubo Games, and was known as After Burner Complete in Japan and Europe. An unlicensed NES port of the game developed by Tengen also exists, which was reworked by Sunsoft for their Japanese-exclusive port to the same console. A port of After Burner to the Game Boy Advance was included in an arcade 4 pack named Sega Arcade Gallery.

After Burner for the Master System was a best-seller for Sega in the United States during 1988.

Computer Gaming World reviewed After Burner on the Master System, citing aircraft depicted in "remarkable detail", "spectacular" scenery, and excellent explosions. On the ZX Spectrum the 1988 conversion of After Burner by Activision was well-received, with Sinclair User describing it as "top-class coin-op conversion destined for the top of the charts" and giving it 90%, whilst Crash magazine gave it 86% overall. Zzap!64's reviewers were unimpressed with the Commodore 64 version which was described as "incredibly disappointing" with "laughably bad" graphics and sound. It was given an overall rating of 17%. A later Computer Gaming World review for the PC was much more critical, giving the game one star out of five and stating that it was inferior to the arcade version.

Reviewing the 32X version, GamePro commented that the graphics, sound, and gameplay are all great, but that the only difference between it and the Genesis version of After Burner II are some minor graphical and audio enhancements, making it only worthwhile to gamers who have never played an After Burner game before.

After Burner II has been translated and ported to numerous home systems: PC Engine, X68000, Mega Drive/Genesis, Famicom, FM Towns Marty, Atari ST, Amiga, Amstrad CPC, Commodore 64, and Sega Saturn.

The game was rebuilt with stereoscopic 3D feature as one of 3D Classics for Nintendo 3DS.

Legacy

Sequels and related games

Although the After Burner brand was long dormant, Sega created a number of aerial combat games centered on the F-14 Tomcat with many similar features, which are frequently regarded as part of the series. These include G-LOC: Air Battle and its sequel Strike Fighter (later rebranded After Burner III in its home release). Later games associated with the series include Sky Target (which retained similar gameplay and presentation to the original, but with the addition of 3D graphics) and Sega Strike Fighter (an arcade flight combat game which featured free-roaming movement, boasting similar music but with an F/A-18 Hornet as the main plane).

In 2006, Sega released a new sequel on Sega Lindbergh hardware, After Burner Climax, the first arcade game to bear the brand since After Burner II.

After Burner Climax was later ported to Xbox Live Arcade and PSN. It was followed by the spin-off After Burner: Black Falcon for the PSP in 2007. After Burner Climax was de-listed in December 2014, leaving the game no longer available for purchase, only to be brought back in March 2019 to digital mobile platforms for free, with ads, under the Sega Forever brand.

In Japan, After Burner II was released on the PlayStation 2 as part of the Sega Ages classic series.

M2 ported After Burner II in Sega's 3D Classics series to the Nintendo 3DS eShop in Japan on 2013 and worldwide in 2015. This version is faithful to the original arcade game with additions, including Touch Controls and screen layouts that resemble the Upright as well as the Commander and Deluxe cabinets. An unlockable new Special mode was also added, which used a time-slowing "Burst" system similar to After Burner Climax, and featured a different story and altered stages. This mode has no stage select or continues, and instead depends on frequent acquisition of extra lives over the course of the game in order to complete it.

In other games
An emulated version of After Burner is playable at the in-game arcade in Shenmue 2.

The plane from After Burner makes a cameo in Fighters Megamix, accessed with a cheat code.

The music from After Burner appears in a remix in Chapter 8, entitled "Route 666", of Bayonetta (developed by PlatinumGames and published by Sega). This remix is reused in Super Smash Bros. for Wii U and Super Smash Bros. Ultimate on the Bayonetta stage, Umbra Clock Tower.

An area based on After Burner, "Carrier Zone", appears as a tennis court in Sega Superstars Tennis and as a race track in Sonic & All-Stars Racing Transformed. The latter also features a playable racer, AGES, whose vehicle transforms into an After Burner-inspired F-14 Tomcat during flight segments.

A remix of After Burner appears in Hatsune Miku: Project DIVA on both the arcade & console versions, complete with Vocaloid vocals.

Notes

References

External links

Retrospective of the series at Hardcore Gaming 101 
After Burner at Lemon Amiga

After Burner Arcade Walkthrough
After Burner II at Arcade History

1987 video games
Amiga games
Amstrad CPC games
Arcade video games
Atari ST games
Commodore 64 games
DOS games
FM Towns games
Mobile games
MSX games
Nintendo Entertainment System games
PlayStation 2 games
Rail shooters
Rutubo Games games
Sega 32X games
Sega-AM2 games
Master System games
Sega Saturn games
X68000 games
Tengen (company) games
Tiger Electronics handheld games
TurboGrafx-16 games
ZX Spectrum games
Sega arcade games
Sega Games franchises
Unauthorized video games
Video games scored by Hiroshi Kawaguchi
Video games scored by Jeroen Tel
Video games designed by Yu Suzuki
Single-player video games
Sega video games
Aircraft carriers in fiction
Video games developed in Japan